Daniel Robert Loper (born January 15, 1982) is a former American football guard. He was drafted by the Tennessee Titans in the fifth round of the 2005 NFL Draft. He played college football at Texas Tech. He last played for the Dallas Cowboys.

Early years
He played high school football at Episcopal High School in Houston, Texas.

Professional career

Detroit Lions
Loper was signed by the Detroit Lions as a free agent prior to the 2009 season.

Loper was released by the Lions on April 15, 2010.

Oakland Raiders
Loper signed with the Oakland Raiders on May 16, 2010.

Dallas Cowboys
Loper was signed by the Dallas Cowboys on October 18, 2011. He was re-signed on August 3, 2012. Loper was released on September 1, 2012 with an injury settlement.

References

External links
Detroit Lions bio
Tennessee Titans bio
Texas Tech Red Raiders bio

1982 births
Living people
People from Houston
Players of American football from Texas
American football offensive tackles
Texas Tech Red Raiders football players
Tennessee Titans players
Detroit Lions players
Oakland Raiders players
Dallas Cowboys players